Crilanomer is a cicatrizant.

Further reading

External links 
 

Dermatologic drugs